Donor (foaled 1944) was an American  Thoroughbred racehorse sired by the champion Challedon. He was bred and owned by W. Deering Howe, the great-grandson of William Deering, founder of the Deering Harvester Company.

Racing at age two, Donor won seven of his twelve races. He won prestigious races such as the  Sapling Stakes at Monmouth Park, the Sanford Stakes at Saratoga Race Course, and the Champagne Stakes at Belmont Park to be considered a top 2 year old. He ran third to the 2 yr old champion Double Jay in the James H. Connors at Narragansett Park.

He returned to racing late in the spring at age three and won the Yankee Handicap at Suffolk Downs. The Daily Racing Form reported: "Deering Howe's Donor, one of the leaders in the juvenile division last season, propelled himself into a contending position for
sophomore honors when he turned in a sparkling effort to account for the $25,000 Yankee  Handicap here this afternoon before a colorful and enthusiastic gathering of 33,196." He also added the Jerome Handicap as a sophomore runner.

As an older horse, he won the Saratoga Handicap, the New York Handicap, and the Manhattan Handicap, and became the first (and only) two-time winner of the Narragansett Special.
70 days after the first Narragansett Special win, W. Deering Howe died at Varadero Beach, Cuba.
His second wife continued to campaign Donor until 1952.

In his second Narragansett Special victory, he defeated Calumet Farm's Kentucky Derby winner Ponder and Santa Anita Handicap winner Vulcan's Forge in a three-way photo. An eye-witness account read

References

External links
 Donor's pedigree and racing stats

1944 racehorse births
Thoroughbred family 9-e
Racehorses bred in Kentucky
Racehorses trained in the United States

ja:ポンダー